Hostetler is a surname of German origin. The name refers to:
Abraham J. Hostetler (1818–1899), American politician from Indiana; U.S. representative 1879–81
Chuck Hostetler (1903–1971), American professional baseball player
Dave Hostetler (b. 1956), American professional baseball player
David Hostetler (b. 1926), American sculptor
Jeff Hostetler (b. 1961), American professional football player
John A. Hostetler (1918–2001), American scholar of the Amish and Hutterite Societies

See also 
Hostettler 
Hochstetler